Athanas areteformis is a species of small alpheid shrimp from the Indo-West Pacific.

Taxonomy
Athanas areteformis belongs to the genus Athanas of the snapping shrimp family Alpheidae. It was first described in 1903 by the French carcinologist Henri Coutière.

Distribution
Athanas areteformis has an Indo-West Pacific distribution. They can be found in South Africa, the Red Sea, Réunion, Maldives, the Philippines, Saipan, Australia, the Marshall Islands, Fiji, Tonga, Samoa, and the Society Islands.

Ecology
They can sometimes be found living among the spines of flower urchins (Toxopneustes pileolus), burrowing urchins (Echinometra mathaei), and collector urchins (Tripneustes gratilla).

References

External links
Photos of Athanas areteformis (University of California, Berkeley)

Alpheidae
Crustaceans of the Indian Ocean
Crustaceans of the Pacific Ocean
Crustaceans described in 1903